The Mavuzi Hydroelectric Power Station is an operational  hydroelectric power project in Mozambique. The power plant, first established in 1957, underwent upgrades and rehabilitation in 2017, adjusting its generating capacity, from 52 megawatts to 41 megawatts, with prolongation of its lifespan by another thirty years.

Location
The power station is located near the villages of Maria and Costina, in Manica Province, along the Revue River, downstream of the Chicamba Hydroelectric Power Station. The geographical coordinates of Mavuzi HPP are: 19°31'34.0"S, 33°29'35.0"E (Latitude:-19.526111, Longitude:33.493056).

Overview
Mavuzi Hydroelectric Power Station (41 megawatts), together with nearby Chicamba Hydroelectric Power Station (44 megawatts), both located in Manica Province, were intended to supply electricity to the provinces of Manica and neighboring Sofala, supplemented with power obtained from the Cahora Bassa Dam.

Due to their age; Mavuzi HPP was commissioned in 1957, and  Chicamba HPP was established in 1968, many replacement parts are not available on the market anymore and maintenance was a challenge in the 21st century. For a period of 3.5 years, beginning in 2013 until February 2017, both stations underwent refurbishment and upgrades, with the contractor manufacturing new hardware to replace what could not purchased on the open market.

Refurbishment and improvements
The refurbishment contract was awarded to a consortium comprising Rainpower, a Norwegian supplier of hydroelectricity generating hardware and Cegelec, a French engineering company. Other entities included Hydrokarst, a French company that socializes in underwater inspection and installations.

Construction costs
The rehabilitation bill in 2017 for both and Mavuzi HPP and  Chicamba HPP is quoted as US$120 million (€90 million at that time). The sources of funding are illustrated in the table below:

See also

List of power stations in Mozambique

References

External links
Mozambique Sets Its Sights On Hydroelectric Development As of 24 April 2017.

Renewable energy power stations in Mozambique
Hydroelectric power stations in Mozambique
Manica Province
Energy infrastructure completed in 1957
Dams completed in 1957
1957 establishments in Mozambique